1840 Naval Air Squadron (1840 NAS) was a Naval Air Squadron of the Royal Navy's Fleet Air Arm. During World War II over 80% of the pilots were from the Royal Netherlands Naval Aviation Service.

References

Citations

Bibliography

External links

 

1800 series Fleet Air Arm squadrons
Military units and formations established in 1944
Military units and formations of the Royal Navy in World War II